In graph theory, a flow network (also known as a transportation network) is a directed graph where each edge has a capacity and each edge receives a flow. The amount of flow on an edge cannot exceed the capacity of the edge. Often in operations research, a directed graph is called a network, the vertices are called nodes and the edges are called arcs.  A flow must satisfy the restriction that the amount of flow into a node equals the amount of flow out of it, unless it is a source, which has only outgoing flow, or sink, which has only incoming flow. A network can be used to model traffic in a computer network, circulation with demands, fluids in pipes, currents in an electrical circuit, or anything similar in which something travels through a network of nodes.

Definition

A network is a directed graph  with a non-negative capacity function  for each edge, and without multiple arcs (i.e. edges with the same source and target nodes).

Flows

Flow functions model the net flow of units between pairs of nodes, and are useful when asking questions such as what is the maximum number of units that can be transferred from the source node s to the sink node t? The amount of flow between two nodes is used to represent the net amount of units being transferred from one node to the other.

The excess function  represents the net flow entering a given node  (i.e. the sum of the flows entering ) and is defined byA node  is said to be active if  (i.e. the node  consumes flow), deficient if  (i.e. the node  produces flow), or conserving if . In flow networks, the source  is deficient, and the sink  is active.

Pseudo-flows, feasible flows, and pre-flows are all examples of flow functions.

A pseudo-flow is a function   of each edge in the network that satisfies the following two constraints for all nodes  and :
The sign of the flow indicates the flow's direction.
Capacity constraint: An arc's flow cannot exceed its capacity, that is: .

A pre-flow is a pseudo-flow that, for all }, satisfies the additional constraint:
Non-deficient flows: The net flow entering the node  is non-negative, except for the source, which "produces" flow. That is:  for all }.

A feasible flow, or just a flow, is a pseudo-flow that, for all }, satisfies the additional constraint:
Flow conservation constraint: The total net flow entering a node  is zero for all nodes in the network except the source  and the sink , that is:  for all . In other words, for all nodes in the network except the source  and the sink , the total sum of the incoming flow of a node is equal to its outgoing flow (i.e. , for each vertex ).
The value  of a feasible flow  for a network, is the net flow into the sink  of the flow network, that is: . Note, the flow value in a network is also equal to the total outgoing flow of source , that is: .

Concepts useful to flow problems

Adding arcs and flows 
We do not use multiple arcs within a network because we can combine those arcs into a single arc. To combine two arcs into a single arc, we add their capacities and their flow values, and assign those to the new arc:
Along with the other constraints, the skew symmetry constraint must be remembered during this step to maintain the direction of the original pseudo-flow arc. Adding flow to an arc is the same as adding an arc with the capacity of zero.

Residuals
The residual capacity of an arc  with respect to a pseudo-flow  is denoted , and it is the difference between the arc's capacity and its flow. That is, .

This concept is used in Ford–Fulkerson algorithm which computes the maximum flow in a flow network.

Augmenting paths
More simply, an augmenting path is an available flow path from the source to the sink. A network is at maximum flow if and only if there is no augmenting path in the residual network .

The bottleneck is the minimum residual capacity of all the edges in a given augmenting path. See example explained in the "Example" section of this article. The flow network is at maximum flow if and only if it has a bottleneck with a value greater than zero.

The term "augmenting the flow" for an augmenting path means updating the flow  of each arc in this augmenting path to equal the capacity  of the bottleneck. Augmenting the flow corresponds to pushing additional flow along the augmenting path until there is no remaining available residual capacity in the bottleneck.

Multiple sources and/or sinks
Sometimes, when modeling a network with more than one source, a supersource is introduced to the graph. This consists of a vertex connected to each of the sources with edges of infinite capacity, so as to act as a global source. A similar construct for sinks is called a supersink.

Example

In Figure 1 you see a flow network with source labeled , sink , and four additional nodes. The flow and capacity is denoted . Notice how the network upholds the skew symmetry constraint, capacity constraint, and flow conservation constraint. Note, Figure 1 is often written in the notation style of Figure 2.

In Figure 3 you see the residual network for the given flow. Notice how there is positive residual capacity on some edges where the original capacity is zero in Figure 1, for example for the edge . This network is not at maximum flow.

Applications

Picture a series of water pipes, fitting into a network. Each pipe is of a certain diameter, so it can only maintain a flow of a certain amount of water. Anywhere that pipes meet, the total amount of water coming into that junction must be equal to the amount going out, otherwise we would quickly run out of water, or we would have a buildup of water. We have a water inlet, which is the source, and an outlet, the sink. A flow would then be one possible way for water to get from source to sink so that the total amount of water coming out of the outlet is consistent. Intuitively, the total flow of a network is the rate at which water comes out of the outlet.

Flows can pertain to people or material over transportation networks, or to electricity over electrical distribution systems.  For any such physical network, the flow coming into any intermediate node needs to equal the flow going out of that node.  This conservation constraint is equivalent to Kirchhoff's current law.

Flow networks also find applications in ecology: flow networks arise naturally when considering the flow of nutrients and energy between different organisms in a food web.  The mathematical problems associated with such networks are quite different from those that arise in networks of fluid or traffic flow.  The field of ecosystem network analysis, developed by Robert Ulanowicz and others, involves using concepts from information theory and thermodynamics to study the evolution of these networks over time.

Classifying flow problems

The simplest and most common problem using flow networks is to find what is called the maximum flow, which provides the largest possible total flow from the source to the sink in a given graph. There are many other problems which can be solved using max flow algorithms, if they are appropriately modeled as flow networks, such as bipartite matching, the assignment problem and the transportation problem. Maximum flow problems can be solved efficiently with the push–relabel algorithm. The max-flow min-cut theorem states that finding a maximal network flow is equivalent to finding a  cut of minimum capacity that separates the source and the sink, where a cut is the division of vertices such that the source is in one division and the sink is in another.

In a multi-commodity flow problem, you have multiple sources and sinks, and various "commodities" which are to flow from a given source to a given sink. This could be for example various goods that are produced at various factories, and are to be delivered to various given customers through the same transportation network.

The objective is to send a given amount of flow from the source to the sink, at the lowest possible price.

In a circulation problem, you have a lower bound  on the edges, in addition to the upper bound . Each edge also has a cost. Often, flow conservation holds for all nodes in a circulation problem, and there is a connection from the sink back to the source. The flow circulates through the network, hence the name of the problem.

In a network with gains or generalized network each edge has a gain, a real number (not zero) such that, if the edge has gain g, and an amount x flows into the edge at its tail, then an amount gx flows out at the head.

In a source localization problem, an algorithm tries to identify the most likely source node of information diffusion through a partially observed network. This can be done in linear time for trees and cubic time for arbitrary networks and has applications ranging from tracking mobile phone users to identifying the originating source of disease outbreaks.

See also
 Braess's paradox
 Centrality
 Ford–Fulkerson algorithm
 Dinic's algorithm
 Flow (computer networking)
 Flow graph (disambiguation)
 Max-flow min-cut theorem
 Oriented matroid
 Shortest path problem
 Nowhere-zero flow

References

Further reading

External links

 Maximum Flow Problem
 Real graph instances
 Lemon C++ library with several maximum flow and minimum cost circulation algorithms
 QuickGraph , graph data structures and algorithms for .Net

Network flow problem